Victor Vlad Cornea and Fabian Fallert were the defending champions and successfully defended their title, defeating Antonio Šančić and Igor Zelenay 6–4, 3–6, [10–2] in the final.

Seeds

Draw

References

External links
 Main draw

Città di Forlì IV - Doubles